Sleaford Town F.C. is a football club based in Sleaford, Lincolnshire, England.

History
Sleaford Town were founded in 1923. They joined the Lincolnshire League, where they were generally successful, being a regular top-ten team. In 2003, Town announced plans to seek a higher level of football in the United Counties League. They had their best-ever season in 2003–04, winning the title for the first time in twenty-three years, and gaining promotion to the UCL

After leaving their previous ground, Sleaford played for three seasons at RAF Cranwell, but despite winning the Division One title in 2005–06, they were not allowed promotion until their new Eslaforde Park ground was ready the following season, and they finished runners-up.

The club are currently members of the United Counties League Premier Division, led by manager Paul Ward.

They first entered the FA Cup in season 2008–09, reaching the First Round Qualifying, while in the FA Vase, their best performance has been to reach the Fourth Round in season 2015-16.

Current squad

Management and coaching staff

Current staff

Honours
United Counties League Division One
Champions 2005–06
Runners-up 2006–07

Records
FA Cup
First Qualifying Round 2008–09, 2009–10
FA Vase
Fourth Round 2015-16

References

External links

Football clubs in England
Association football clubs established in 1968
United Counties League
Football clubs in Lincolnshire
1968 establishments in England
Lincolnshire Football League